The Torontos may refer to the following professional ice hockey clubs based in Toronto, Ontario, Canada:

Toronto Blueshirts (1912–1917)
Toronto Arenas (1917–1919)

Ice hockey teams in Toronto
History of the Toronto Maple Leafs